Binalood wind farm is a wind farm situated in Razavi Khorasan Province of Iran near the city of Nishapur. It currently uses 43 turbines with a generating capacity of 660 kW to produce 28.2 MW of electricity using wind power. The project was initiated in 2002 and the farm came online in 2008. The plant was built by Renewable energy organization of Iran. The plant is currently being expanded by adding 50 more turbines, each with a capacity of 660 kW, increasing its total capacity to 61.2 MW.

See also
 
Wind power in Iran
Manjil and Rudbar Wind Farm
Iran–Armenia Wind Farm
List of power stations in Iran

References

External links
Renewable energy organization of Iran

Wind farms in Iran
Buildings and structures in Razavi Khorasan Province
Buildings and structures in Nishapur